Fast Company is a business publication.

Fast Company may also refer to:
Fast Company (1918 film), a film starring Lon Chaney Sr.
Fast Company (1924 film), an Our Gang short
Fast Company (1929 film), a film starring Evelyn Brent
Fast Company (1938 film), a film featuring Melvyn Douglas and Florence Rice
Fast Company (1953 film), a film by John Sturges
Fast Company (1979 film), a film by David Cronenberg
"Fast Company", a 2007 song by the Eagles from Long Road Out of Eden

See also
Fleet Antiterrorism Security Team or FAST, part of the U.S. Marine Corps Security Force Regiment 
In Fast Company (disambiguation)